Ionic was the name of two ships of the White Star Line:

, in service until 1900

Ship names